James Dwyer may refer to:
James Francis Dwyer (1874–1952), Australian writer
James Dwyer (politician) (1881–1932), Irish Cumann na nGaedhael politician
Pat Dwyer (American football) or James K. Dwyer (1884–1939), American football coach
James Dwyer (gymnast) (fl. 1904), American Olympic gymnast
Jim Dwyer (rugby league) (1902–1983), Australian rugby league player
James J. Dwyer (fl. 1957–2019), American politician in the Massachusetts House of Representatives
Jim Dwyer (baseball) (born 1950), Major League Baseball player
Jim Dwyer (journalist) (1957–2020), New York Times journalist
Jamie Dwyer (born 1979), Australian field hockey player
James Dwyer (taekwondo) (born 1982), Irish taekwondo practitioner

See also 
Séamus Dwyer (1886–1922), Irish Sinn Féin politician